Eduardo Montes-Bradley (born 9 July 1960) is an American-Argentine writer, filmmaker, and photographer. He is best known for documentaries Evita, Che: Rise and Fall, Rita Dove: An American Poet (2012), Uneath and understood and Harto The Borges. His most recent film is Daniel Chester French: American Sculptor

Life
Montes-Bradley first mentioned in film credits is in Margareta Vinterheden's Man maste ju leva, Sweden, 1978. In 1980 he was the New York correspondent for El Heraldo del Cine In 1984 he founded The Entertainment Herald. In 1989 he produced SmoothTalker with Stuart Whitman, Burt Ward and Sydney Lassik, a year later he wrote and directed Double Obsession, starring Maryam D'Abo, Margaux Hemingway, Scott Valentine and Frederick Forrest, Double Obsession was released by Columbia Tri-Star. "The Kidnapping" (El sekuestro, 1995) was his last fiction film. In 1997 Montes-Bradley directed "Soriano" first in a series on Latin American writers produced by Contrakultura Films. Other titles, such as Samba On Your Feet, explored Caribbean and Afro-Brazilian cultures. In 2008 Montes-Bradley co-founded Heritage Film Project. His films are available in academic as well as public libraries. Montes-Bradley is credited under the pseudonyms Diana Hunter and Rita Clavel.

Filmography

Non Fiction

 Daniel Chester French: American Sculptor – Documentary about the American Renaissance sculptor who designed Abraham Lincoln, the larger-than-life seated statue at the Lincoln Memorial in Washington, D.C., and The Minuteman. Throughout the film, the director approaches a select number of public art and sculpture experts, including Thayer Tolles, Harold Holzer, Michele Bogart, Eve Kahn, Adrian Benepe, Michael Richman, and Richard Guy Wilson from the University of Virginia. The film pays particular attention to the relationship between American sculptors and Italian-American stone cutters and sculptures such as the Piccirilli brothers and the relationship with life female models with a particular focus on the African American model Hettie Anderson. Filmed on location at Chesterwood, Lincoln Memorial,Brooklyn Botanic Garden, and the University of Virginia. The film was made possible with the support of the National Trust for Historic Preservation.
 Black Fiddlers – Traces the stories of violin players of African descent in New York, North Carolina, Ohio, Virginia, Texas, Missouri, and Oregon during the Indian Wars and the Gold Rush. Includes conversations with Rhiannon Giddens, authors Howard and Judith Sacks, Kip Lornell, John Jeremiah Sullivan, and Marshall Wyatt. Produced with a gift from The Joseph and Robert Cornell Memorial Foundation. Official Selection at the Virginia Film Festival, 2022. HD – 60 minutes  Rhiannon Giddens: "You know, when you look back at your life, and there's always crossroads, there's always before and after events, you know. And meeting Joe, and not just meeting him but becoming his apprentice, is one of those crossroad events." -Luke Church
 The Other Madisons – Based on the homonymous book The Other Madisons: The Lost History of a President's Black Family by Bettye Kearse, the film explores the life of African-American descendants of James Madison. According to the author, Bettie Kearse, before becoming the 4th fourth President of the United States, and while still on his farm at James Madison's Montpelier, Madison fathered a child with an enslaved woman named Coreen. The film then traces multiple descendants while contextualizing each generation to corresponding historical circumstances. HD – 38 min – 16:9 Official Selection at Mystic Film Festival, Martha's Vineyard Film Festival, Atlanta Black Pride Film Festival, 2021; Official Selection DC Black Film Festival, 2021; Official Selection Roxbury International Film Festival, 2021. Honorable Mention, Black Truth Film Festival, 2022.
 Alice: At Home With Alice Parker – Biographical documentary exploring the life, and works of composer-conductor Alice Parker. Filmed in Hawley. Alice focuses on the formative years and the collaborations with Robert Shaw, and with the works of Martin Luther King Jr., Archibald MacLeish, Eudora Welty and Emily Dickinson. American premiere by Chorus America on October 8, 2020. Grand Jury Prize, Mystic Film Festival, 2021; Official Selection, 2020 Virginia Film Festival. Distributed by Kanopy. Produced in 2020 by HFP in association with Melodious Accord, Inc.
 Searching 4-Tabernero – Documentary about Jewish-German cinematographerPeter Peter Paul Weinschenk, also known as Pablo Tabernero for his contributions to the Golden Age of Argentine cinema in multiple films directed by Carlos Hugo Christensen, Mario Soffici, Hugo del Carril, and Luis Saslavsky. Three of his films were curated in a film noir retrospective by MOMA in 2015. Peter Paul Weinschenk was awarded the Premio Condor de Plata and is increasingly being recognized for his collaboration with the Anarchist Movement in Barcelona during the Spanish Civil War.
 A Soldier's Dream: The Milt Feldman Story – The film narrates the vicissitudes of Milt Feldman as infantry soldier with the 106th Infantry Division. Feldman was captured at the Battle of the Bulge and marched to Stalag IV-B, where he remained a POW until the arrival of the Red Army. "A Soldier's Dream" premiered in Pleasanton on August 11, 2018, It was awarded Best Documentary at the 9th Historical and Military Film Festival, Warsaw, Best Biography at Oniros Film Awards, 2019, and Best Feature Documentary at Port Orchard Film Festival, 2019. Official Selection at the Western European Film Festival, 2019; Courage Film Festival, Berlin, 2019; San Francisco Veteran's Film Festival, 2018, Flickers' Rhode Island International Film Festival, 2018, and the Great Western Catskills International Film Festival, 2018. Aired on PBS. HD – 60 minutes
 The Gillenwater Story – Biographical portrayal of Jay Y. Gillenwater, UVA academic physician and researcher, a woodland gardener with an old-school belief in family, friendship, and self-sufficiency. This portrait of a plain-spoken scientist who married his childhood sweetheart brings out the wisdom of an unassuming Southerner and the moral compass of an exemplary man. HD – 30 min.
 Monroe Hill – Explores the historical context of James Monroe's first plantation in Albemarle County in times of the French Revolution. The colonial building known as Monroe Hill predates Highland and the University of Virginia and currently serves as the administrative offices of Brown Residential College.
Unearthed and Understood, Documentary commissioned by the University of Virginia, President's Commission on Slavery and the university (PCSU). Premiered on October 16, 2014, at the conference "Universities Confronting the Legacy of Slavery" in Charlottesville. HD – 18 minutes.
 Rita Dove: An American Poet – HFP. Portrayal of Rita Dove. The one-hour-long documentary is made of a series of conversations between the writer and the filmmaker. These conversations took place in Charlottesville between September 2012 and October 2013. Edited using still and home movies from the Dove family's collection. Premiered in Charlottesville on January 31, 2014 Distributed by Filmmakers Library & Alexander Street Press, USA. Color and Black and White.
 Julian Bond: Reflections from the Frontlines of the Civil Rights Movement – Biographical film about social activist Julian Bond, founding member of the Student Nonviolent Coordinating Committee, and former Georgia legislator.  Presented at the British Academy., Awarded Best Documentary at 4th Baltimore International Black Film Festival. Distributed by Filmmakers Library & Alexander Street Press, USA. HD, 34 min.
 J.J.Lankes: Yankee Printmaker in Virginia – Explores the life and work of Julius John Lankes who illustrated the works of Robert Frost, Sherwood Anderson, and Roark Bradford among other writers of his generation. Made in collaboration with Welford Dunaway Taylor and the University of Richmond. US premiere as Official Selection at Buffalo International Film Festival as part of a special exhibit organized by the Burchfield Penney Art Center and the State University of New York. Official Selection at the Virginia Film Festival, 2019. 
 White: A Season in the Life of John Borden Evans – Portrayal of Virginian artist John Borden Evans, filmed at the artist's 19th-century farm in North Garden in the winter of 2015. Awarded Best Documentary at the 4th International Documentary Festival of Ierapetra; Best Documentary at Richmond International Film Festival, and it was shown at the Official Selection at the Virginia Film Festival. HD, 30 min.
 Andrés Waissman – Expositive documentary about Andrés Waissman. Filmed in Palermo in the artist's studio. Premiered at MALBA on July 10, 2012. HD – 30 min.
 Humberto Calzada – Portrayal of Cuban-American artist Humberto Calzada. The film explores Calzada's childhood in Havana, Cuba before the Revolution. Calzada's meticulous attempt to reconstruct the past is a constant on his work. Original Music by Gerardo Aguillón (violin) and José Angel Navarro (guitar). Distributed by Alexander Street Press and Kanopy. HD – 16:9 – 30 min.
 Ernesto Deira – Documentary tribute to Ernesto Deira, founding member of the neofigurative movement in Paris which also included Luis Felipe Noe,Romulo Maccio and Jorge de la Vega. The documentary was produced with support from the Museo de Nacional de Bellas Artes. HD|20 min.
 Pérez Celis – Biographical portrayal of contemporary artist Pérez Celis. Filmed at the artist's studio in Little Haiti, Florida. In a conversational style, Celis discusses the influences of Picasso and Matisse in his work, his political views, his recollection of Evita, and his exiles in Caracas and in Paris. Produced in part with an award from INCAA. USA-Argentina, 2005.HD|60 min

 Cortázar: apuntes para un documental – Documentary exploring the political views of Julio Cortázar's on the Latin American progressive movement during the 1960s. The film includes previously unseen home movies filmed by Cortázar, an avid 8mm aficionado, shot in Paris with Carole Dunlop; in the gardens of the Mexican Embassy in New Delhi with Aurora Bernardez, Octavio Paz, Elena Garro and Nicaragua with Claribel Alegría, Ernesto Cardenal, Manuel Antín, Carlos Montemayor, and Sergio Ramírez. Locations: Managua, Buenos Aires, Paris, Linz Am Rhien, Madrid, and Rome. Nominated for Best Documentary, 2003 by the Argentine Film Critics Association.
 Los cuentos del timonel – (Tells of the Helmsman) Is a biographical sketch of journalist and historian Osvaldo Bayer. The film traces Bayer's life in Buenos Aires to the German colony in Argentina in the 1930s and 1940s. From this period, Bayer evokes Adolf Hitler's birthday as thousands celebrated it at the German Club – Club Albatros of Buenos Aires: "They came in into the streets of Belgrano in a caravan, often lead by the German Ambassador to Argentina Baron Edmund von Thurman. According to Bayer, when the ambassador arrived at the German Club, the band started playing Hitler's favorite tune, the Badonviller Marsch. "Los cuentos del timonel" was awarded Best Documentary by the Argentine Film Critics Association 2002. Bayer also explores his relationship with Paco Urondo, Julio Cortázar, Hector Olivera, Osvaldo Soriano, Rodolfo Walsh and others. Los cuentos del timonel was filmed using a Bolex 16mm and a Sony Handycam DCR-VX1000.
 Harto The Borges – Documentary film on Jorge Luis Borges. Presented at the 12e Rencontres Cinémas d'Amerique Latine, Toulouse, Mars 2000. Nominated for a Cóndor de Plata.
 Ecce Homo – Documentary based on the last interview with centenarian Juan Filloy, Produced in part with an award from INCAA
 Osvaldo Soriano – Original title "Soriano", the documentary had a theatrical release in Buenos Aires first before being presented in the US, on October 29, 1999, during the "Hispanic Literature and Film at the End of the Millennium Conference on Iberian-American Literature". Florida International University.Revistra Veintitrés, Issues 251–255, Comunicación Grupo Tres, 2003. Buenos Aires, Argentina. Page 56. Produced in part with an award from INCAA
 Saavedra: Between Berlin and a place called Peixoto – Biographical documentary on Brazilian author Carola Saavedra. Filmed on location in Berlin and Rio de Janeiro. Saavedra premiered October 9, 2013, at Frankfurt International Book Fair. Official Selection Pedra Azul Film Festival. Filmmaker produces documentaries on Ronaldo Correia de Brito and José Luiz Passos.Germano, Tiago: "Un biógrafo de lentes" | Vida & Arte | Jornal da Paraiba. Editor: André Cananéa | Sunday, November 2, 2014 Heritage Film Project + Writers Made in Brazil, 2013. HD, 30 min. Produced in part with a grant from the Brazilian Ministry of External Relations – Embassy of Brazil, Washington, D.C.
 Lisboa – Biographical portrayal of Brazilian writer Adriana Lisboa Fábregas Gurevitz, and her experience as a Carioca writer living in Louisville where the documentary was filmed in February 2012. The film presents the writer and her perspectives on exile and literature, on living abroad and in a bilingual universe. Lisboa premiered on WHTJ PBS / WCVE PBS, Virginia, also aired by Rocky Mountain PBS. Italian Avant Premier with Italian subtitles at Festivaletteratura – Mantua, Italy on September 5, 2014,  Heritage Film Project + Writers Made in Brazil, 2012. HD, 30 min. (English) Produced in part with a grant from the Brazilian Ministry of External Relations – Embassy of Brazil, Washington, D.C.
 Evita (Documentary). Documentary (2007) about Eva Duarte, former First Lady of Argentina. Evita, the illegitimate child without social or economic standing, was determined to make it big in the world of entertainment. Her love affair with a rising political star (Juan Domingo Perón) transformed her into a vital part of Perón's plans to seduce a nation. The charming Evita became a skilled public speaker that fitted perfectly with politics in Argentina. Just imagine Marilyn Monroe with the charisma of Princess Diana, elevated by Joseph Goebbels's propaganda machine as the indisputable Spiritual Leader of the Nation. The documentary appears to be fair, perhaps the first biography on the subject that strives to be balanced. Evita was screened at the Virginia Film Festival, in Charlottesville, on November 4, 2011. 

 Leon Rozitchner's Window, (La Ventana de Leon Rozitchner, USA, 2008) Montes-Bradley maintained a personal and epistolary relationship with Leon Rozitcher that lasted over fifteen years. During all that time the philosopher, a disciple of Merleau-Ponty, objected to the invitation to talk in front of the camera. That window suddenly opened one day when the director came to visit. (17').Montes-Bradley, Eduardo. "Rozitchner íntimo en tres tomas continuas". Revista de Cultura Ñ. Ideas-Filosofía. Diario Clarin. September 5, 2011  Anecdotical documentary with philosopher León Rozitchner.*
 The Unanimous Night (USA, 2018). The public reappearance of Luis Harss arises from an interview with Tomás Eloy Martínez published in La Nación in 2008. Shortly thereafter, Montes-Bradley begins a documentary dialogue in Mercersburg. In The Unanimous Night, Harss refers to a visit by Jorge Luis Borges and the relationship between biographer and subject. (5').
 Dialogue and Moisture, (USA, 2018). A short film by Montes-Bradley serves as a trigger with which Luis Harss evokes the place of privilege that nostalgia occupies in his perpetual exile. (5')
 Child of the Forest: The Story of Yona Bromberg. HFP, 2014. The film documents the memories of Holocaust survivor Yona Bromberg who recalls being herded—along with the rest of the Jews in Rokitno—to the market where the occupying German forces open machine-gun fire killing almost everyone. Yona Bromberg, her mother, and sister run for cover into the forest where they survived among other refugees until the arrival of the Soviet Army. "Child of the Forest:" was filmed in Hallandale.
 American Manifesto Avantgarde short film premiered at BAFICI, 2005. Filmed in Denver, during the winter of 1993.
 Che: Rise & Fall. DVD Release Date: July 13, 2006, by Westlake Entertainment, German Release, 20007, Latin American premiered on NatGeo. CHE: Rise and Fall, follows on the trials and tribulations of Ernesto Guevara in the words of old friends and comrades-in-arms. Includes the testimonies of Guevara's friend Alberto Granado, and members of his elite military entourage Alberto Castellanos, Enrique Oltuski, Argudín Mendoza, Enrique "Pombo" Villegas. Locations: Havana, Congo, Bolivia. Super 16mm. Aspect Ratio: 1.66:1
 Samba On Your Feet USA – Brazil 2005. The documentary explores behind the scenes of Carnival in Rio, revealing the preambles of the cultural clash leading to Samba, an indigenous cultural tradition in Brazil. Samba On Your Feet includes archival material and interviews with iconic figures of Brazilian Carnival and Samba. "Samba On Your Feet" was selected to participate at the Toulouse Latin American Film Festival 2008, Rio de Janeiro International Film Festival 2006, Buenos Aires Independent Film Festival (BAFICI) 2007, and Toronto Latino Film Festival."Espaço Cine Digital exhibe filmes de documentarista argentino". Iparabiba, Brazil. Educação e Cultura. September 20, 2010.   The film is distributed by Filmmakers Library. Worldwide rights by Alexander Street Press. The documentary gained the recognition of African American Studies.University of California, Center for Media and Independent LearningMorris, Giles. "Local Filmmaker takes on the civil rights struggle..." C-Ville Weekly, November 1, 2012, p. 18
 Ismael Viñas: Witness of a Century. Original title: Ismael Viñas: Testigo del siglo. Film based on the memoirs and recollections of Ismael Viñas: legendary political figure, economist, founder of Movimiento de Liberación Nacional (MALENA), former Undersecretary of Culture during the Revolución Libertadora. Viñas reappears in front of the camera after twenty-six years in self-imposed exile, first in Israel and finally in the US. During a series of conversations with Montes-Bradley in Florida, USA, Viñas reflects on his youth, on his brother David, on his father, a well political character during the times of Hipólito Yrigoyen, and a Federal Judge in Patagonia during the uprisings portrayed in Rebellion in Patagonia in the early 1920s. Viñas also recalls his imprisonment during the Peronist period and with particular emphasis his relationship with Ernesto Che Guevara, and Salvador Allende amongst other figures of the period. The film was acclaimed and criticize by extremist elements on the right and particularly on the left where the Ismael Viñas portrayed in the documentary was perceived as betraying the Marxist ideology he once embraced.Sebreli, Juan José El tiempo de una vida. Ed. Sudamericana, Argentina, 2005. p.186 Directed by Montes-Bradley as Diana Hunter. Premiered at the Buenos Aires International Festival of Independent Cinema.

 The Great Pretender. Official Selection of the International Film Festival of Buenos Aires (BAFICI), 2007. Released in Uruguay as "No a los papelones". Release in Argentina as El gran simulador. The film presents the case of Nahuel Maciel who passed as a native Mapuche to further his credibility in journalism. As such he negociated the publication of fabricated interviews with Gabriel García Márquez, Umberto Eco, Mario Vargas Llosa and John Paul II.  Initialy black listed in Argentina the film was finally released in Uruguay.  However, the film was shown as part of the Official Selection at (BAFICI), 2007. On the director's request the film did not participate "in competition" to avoid further turmoil. In April 2008, the film was released on DVD in Argentina by Editorial Perfil, an opposition to the government media outlet.
 Crónicas Mexicas. The documentary follows in the footsteps of Hernán Cortés from the landing beaches of Veracruz on the golf coast of Mexico, to Tenochtitlan, the ancient capital of the Aztec. Montes-Bradley (as Rita Clavel) teamed with Martín Caparrós who becomes the omnipresent protagonist of this journey through geography and time. Caparrós acute sense of irony becomes a permanent fixture throughout the film, provoking the audience into uncharted: the politically incorrect history of Latin America.
 Tríptico Vertical, USA 1986. Not much is known about the nearly fifteen minutes film made with the Madres de Plaza de Mayo. It was filmed in Buenos Aires after the return to democratic rule in 1983. Music by Julio Lacarra.

Experimental
 Frogments, (USA, 2000). Experimental work on images captured by Julio Cortázar in 8 mm and verses by Allen Ginsberg. The gestation of this short film was part of the dialogue between the director and Aurora Bernárdez during the investigation period that ended with Cortázar: notes form a documentary (2002) and Cortázar without a beard (Random House Mondadori, 2004). (3').
 Freedom, (USA, 1986). Experimental work based on images captured by Montes-Bradley in 8 mm in and around Los Angeles, Chicago, and Miami in which the filmmaker highlights the marginal precariousness of those who survive in the streets of the most prosperous nation. In this short film, the United States emerges as a society with the same conflicts as developing countries. (3').

Fiction
 

 (The KidNapping) Satire-Farce. El Sekuestro depicts an absurd revolutionary movement in Rio Hondo, a fictitious republic in Latin America. Bruno (Tobias Meincke) runs a classified ad to find partners for a kidnapping. Replying to the ad are Carmen, a street worker (Sandra Ballesteros), Mario (Adam Black) auto-worker, and Luis (Luis Fernández). The band kidnaps Renato Cefalú (Lázaro Pérez), and his wife (Alex Pertile) refuses to pay the ransom. Following the premiere at the Mar del Plata International Film Festival. The film is a political farce taking on the events that marked Argentine life during the 1970s. It has been said that the plot is an excuse to mock the struggle of the guerrilla organizations that confronted the military regime led by Jorge Rafael Videla. El SeKuestro was filmed in South Beach in 1995.

 Thriller. Starring Margaux Hemingway, Beth Fisher, Scott Valentine, Jamie Horton, Maryam D'Abo and Frederic Forrest. Edited by John Venzon. TriStar Columbia and Reivaj Films, 1992. The film did well with foreign distribution, particularly in the straight to video and cable markets. ' Double Obsession' was shot on 35 mm at the University of Colorado in Boulder, and a final transfer to the video was later produced. Montes-Bradley hardly ever talks about this film, written by himself in collaboration with Jeffrey Delman and Rick Marx. The film was initially referred to as Mirror Image.Colorado Daily. August 2–5, 1991 Vol. 98 No. 183, Staff Writer Michael SandrockThe Denver Post, September 25, 1992.

 Thriller, Film Noire. USA, 1992. Produced by Smoothtalker Productions. Story: "The woman who 976 numbers offer the men who call a world of erotic fantasy. But they never know who lurks on the other side of the line". Starring Blair (Lisa) Weikgenant as Lisa Charles, Peter Crombie as Jack Perdue, Stuart Whitman as Lt. Gallagher, Sidney Lassick, Joe Guzaldo, Paul Raci as Peri and Burt Ward. Edited by Sandra Adair. Executive Producer Javier Gracia. Original score by Tony Roman; Production Design by Brian Densmore. US Release: June 18, 1992

 Music videos 
Montes-Bradley directed music videos at odds with the dominant trends when MTV was still in the experimental stage. Rumbera (trad. a woman who dances the rumba), by Willy Chirino,(Sony Music, 1994. "Rumbera," the film extravaganza shot in the style of the neorealism with magic realism undertones. The seven-minute short was filmed in a single take in the interior of a cabaret in South Beach. The Cameraman and Director of Photography was Scott Mumford. Rumbera opened the doors for other salsa music videos to be regularly programmed in MTV Latino, until then, exclusively reserved for Rock, Pop, and ballads from South American and Spaniard bands and soloists. Rumbera, filmed in Super 16mm, premiered in Havana, during the Festival Internacional del Nuevo Cine Latinoamericano in 1994. Dale Pascual (Warner Music Group) by the Argentine pop-group "Los enanitos verdes" was shot in 35 mm in La Cava, 27 miles North of CABA. The song speaks of the hardships of the impoverished immigrants living in Argentina. La Cava provided the ideal setting, typical of neo-realism. The film stages the crucifixion of a child representing poverty. The image of a large wooden cross laying against the walls of a public school with the Argentine flag on a high mast in the background was censored. "Dale Pascual" was the last music video produced and directed by Montes-Bradley.

 Bibliography 
Ideography, Biographical approach to Peter Paul Weinschenk, life and works of Pablo Tabernero, cinematographer of Prisioneros de la tierra directed by Mario Soffici.Los dedos del huracán. Short story. Children Literature. Included on "De Ola en Ola 3" School Textbook for Third Grade. Group Macmillan. Editorial Estrada S.A., Buenos Aires, Argentina. Illustrated by Eugenia Nobati. p. 62–67

 Bio-bibliographical essay on .Academia.edu "La resurrección de Ocantos".

 Biography of Julio Cortázar including a genealogical study.Barrientos, Juan José. Review of "Cortázar sin barba". Revista de Crítica Literaria Latinoamericana Año 32, No. 63/64 (2006), pp. 371–374 Published by Centro de Estudios Literarios "Antonio Cornejo Polar". Xalapa University, México.  A first edition was published by Editorial Sudamericana, Argentina, in 2004. A Third Edition (revised) was published by Pesódromo 21, in 2014.Julio Cortázar: El otro lado de las cosas by Miguel Herráez. Institució Alfons el Magnànim, Diputació de València,2001.Broichhagen, Vera. "Julio Cortázar o las barbas del diablo". Cuadernos Lirico. Revista de la red inter-universitaria de estudios sobre las literaturas rioplatenses contemporáneas en Francia. Université Paris VIII Vincennes – Saint-Denis/Princeton University. October 11, 2012.Cortázar sin Barba Official Site | Pesódromo 21. BlogUniversidade Federal da Paraiba: "Cortázar: Social Issues and Politics". Lecture, October 2014. João Pessoa, Brazil.

 Bilingual Anthology of Short Stories. Selection of awarded works at the Literary Award "Agua no terceiro Milenio", Brazil. Published in Portuguese and Spanish. Pilar Editors, Brasília, 2000. P. 142, 143, 144. Includes the short story "Das schwerste gewicht" previously published in "Ya se que todo es mentira" (1999), Editorial del Nuevo Extremo, Buenos Aires 1999.

 Sperling & Kupfer Editori, Milan, Italy, 2001, 164pp. Translated by Gina Maneri. Collection: Continente Desaparecido, directed and coordinated by Gianni Minà . The book includes interviews with Ariel Dorfman, Eduardo Galeano, Ana María Shua, Martín Caparrós, Fernando Birri, Aida Bortnik, Roberto Cossa, Liliana Hecker, Federico Luppi, Hector Olivera, Nico Orengo, Dalmiro Saenz, Gianni Minà, and others. One of the recurrent themes through the book is the idea of exile, Peronism, and the political turmoil in Argentina during the 1970s. The book is based on the homonymous documentary film by the author. Includes correspondence between Osvaldo Soriano and Adolfo Bioy Casares, Julio Cortázar, and Juan Gelman.Osvaldo Soriano: Una contrautopía posmoderna, by Cristián Montes, Published by RIL Editores, 2004. pp. 45, 53, 87.

 (trad. I know it Its All Lies). Some of the short stories included have been previously published in literary magazines. Foreword by Osvaldo Bayer. 199 pp. 23 cm. Foreword by Osvaldo Bayer. Design by Oscar "Negro" Díaz.

'Senxo', Selected Poems. Editorial Grupo Archivo de Comunicación, New York City, 1984. Foreword by Armando Tejada Gómez. Out of print.

 Journalism 
Montes-Bradley has contributed to El País, Babelia, Les cinemas de la Amerique Latine by the Association Rencontres Cinémas d'Amérique Latine de Toulouse France; La Jornada, México; the monthly review Latinoamérica e Tutto il Sud dell Mondo, Italy; and in Argentina to the literary magazine Esperando a Godot; the art-magazine Revista Lote, Venado Tuerto, Suplemento Radar published by Página/12, El Amante de cine, "Diario Perfil," "Revista Ñ" Clarin, Critica de Argentina; and La Nación. Montes-Bradley was a frequent collaborator with the literary blog "Nación Apache."

His interventions in the media can be classified as a. In-depth articles on subjects as diverse as the life of Dean Reed in the Soviet Union, and the aftermath of the Battleship Potemkin; b. Sudden and brief pieces on current affairs with a particular emphasis on domestic politics in Argentina. One of Montes-Bradley's bull's eyes of choice appears to be the National Institute of Cinematography (INCAA) a government institution repeatedly denounced for corruption, censorship and the discretionary handling of public resources. c. Letters to the Editor. In this, the most singular form of interventionism Montes-Bradley has written a considerable number of letters to the editors becoming a regular de facto columnist.Bousquet, Franck. "Cinéma et identités collectives: actes du 3e Colloque de Sorèze" p.199

 Photography 
Montes-Bradley's photography has been recognized by the National Council on Public History with the "Outstanding Public History Project Award" as part of the exhibit "The Mere Distinction of Colour" produced by James Madison's Montpelier. His work appeared in The Atlantic, The Washington Post, La Nacion, The New York Times,The Independent, Deutsche Welle, Diario Clarin other newspapers and magazines as well as commemorative books such as "Escenas de la memoria. La Casa Argentina en la voz de sus antiguos residentes",Ensemble. Revista electrónica de la Casa Argentina en París. Año 5 – número 11 – . Portrait of Leon Rozitchner and "Aventura Turnberry Jewish Center 20th Anniversary". His portraits and filmed interviews with Research and Clinical Faculty are preserved at the Claude Moore Health Sciences Library, the University of Virginia under The Eduardo Montes-Bradley Photograph and Film Collection.

Awards and honors
 White: A Season in the Life of John Borden Evans: Best Documentary, "White, a Season in the Life of John Borden Evans". Richmond International Film Festival.; Best Documentary Film 6th International Documentary Festival of Ierapetra Awards, 2017
 Monroe Hill: Jefferson Trust Award Shared with Soledad Liendo, Brown College at Monroe Hill and the Curry School of Education 
 Julian Bond: Reflections from the Frontlines of the Civil Rights Movement: Best Documentary Film 4th Annual Baltimore International Black Film Festival 
 Harto The Borges: Official Selection 12e Rencontres Cinémas d'Amerique Latine. Toulouse, Mars 2000.

Appearances in other mediaMargaux Hemingway Bio-documentary on Margaux Hemingway produced for the series E! True Hollywood Story by E! Entertainment Television. USA, 1996.Jorge Giannoni. NN, ése soy yo (NN, The One in the Picture Is Me). Documentary film by Gabriela Jaime on Jorge Giannoni Argentina, 2000.Derrumbe. Guebel, Daniel (Fiction). Random House Mondadori, 2012. Eduardo Montes-Bradley is EMB, a fictional character.Mis escritores muertos. Guebel, Daniel (Fiction). Random House Mondadori, 2012. Eduardo Montes-Bradley is EMB, a fictional character.
 Zenitram. A film by Luis Barone. Montes-Bradley plays the part of a physician in a surreal context. Argentina, 2010.Man maste ju leva. Actor. Directed by Margareta Vinterheden. Sweden, 1978.

 References 

External links

 Notes 
 Roca, Pilar Las vidas paralelas de Montes-Bradley Grupo Archivo de Comunicación. New York, 2010. University of Virginia Libraries; University of Virginia Library; UVa Library 
 Abos, Alvaro Xul Solar: Pintor del misterio. Sudamericana, 2004. p. 289
 Lindner, Franco Cooke: El heredero maldito de Perón: la biografía. Editorial Sudamericana, 2006
 Arnold, Jorge Revista de critica literaria latinoamericana.. Latinoamericana Editores.
 Nagy-Zekmi, Silvia Moros en la costa: Orientalismo en America Latina. Iberoamericana.p. 192.
 Sebreli, Juan JoseEl tiempo de una vida: Autobiografía. Editorial Sudamericana, 2005
 "Reviews on Latin American and Chinese Art by Eduardo Montes-Bradley" Art and Wealth 
 Bustos, Graciela Audiovisuales de combate: Acerca del Videoactivismo Contemporáneo. Published by Centro Cult. de España, Bs.As., 2006. p. 83
 Kriger, Clara / Spadaccini, Silvana Páginas de cine. Archivo General de la Nación, República Argentina, 2003. p. 103
 Tiempo de hoy. Published by Ediciones Tiempo, S.A., Spain, 2005. p. 84
 Mazzeo, Miguel / Ramb, Ana María Osvaldo Bayer: Miradas sobre su obra. C.C.C., ED. del Inst. Movilizador de Fondos Coo., 2003. p. 96
 Neifert, Agustin, Del papel al celuloide: Escritores argentinos en el cine. La Crujía Ediciones, 2003. pp. 48, 49, 54.
 Di Benedetto, Antonio and Lebenglik, Fabian El Pentágono: Novela en forma de cuentos. Adriana Hidalgo Editores, 2005. p. 13
 Aguilar, Gonzalo Moisés Otros mundos: Ensayo sobre el nuevo cine argentino. Santiago Arcos Editor, 2006. pp. 228, 130, 231.
 Fernandez Naval, F.X. Respirar por el idioma: (los Gallegos y Julio Cortázar). Contributor Emilia Veiga Torre. Editorial Corregidor, 2007. pp. 14, 38, 192
 Versants. By Collegium Romanicum. Published by L'age d'homme, 2001. 262, 266.
 Nelson Bayardo and José Pedro Rilla Carlos Gardel: A la luz de la historia. Editorial Aguilar, 2000. p. 117
 María Gabriela Barbara, Cittadini. Vindicaciones del infinito.Fundación Internacional Jorge Luis Borges, 2003. p. 38
 Neifert, Agustín. Del papel al celuloide Edition: illustrated. La Crujía Ediciones, 2003
 Mesa Gancedo, Daniel Avatares del personaje artificial en la novela Argentina de los 90. America Latina Hy, 30, 2002, Ediciones Universidad de Salamanca. p. 168.
 Neyret, Juan Pablo. Para textos bastan y sobran''. La conformación del espacio paratextual en Triste, solitario y final, de Osvaldo Soriano. Universidad Nacional de Mar del Plata.
 Sainz Borgo, Karina. "Julio Cortázar: franquista en Buenos Aires, marxista en Estados Unidos y burgués en Cuba" 
 Montes-Bradley, Eduardo. "Notes On Myself" 
 Les cinemas de la Amerique Latine 
 Alexander Street Press
 Greenacord 
 Thomas Osgood Bradley Foundation TOBF
 Mar del Plata Film Festival 

1960 births
Living people
20th-century American Jews
Alternative journalists
American alternative journalists
American essayists
American film editors
American film producers
American non-fiction writers
American people of Argentine-Jewish descent
Argentine emigrants to the United States
20th-century American painters
American male painters
21st-century American painters
Argentine essayists
American male essayists
Argentine male writers
Argentine documentary film directors
Virginia Democrats
Argentine Jews
Argentine people of German descent
Argentine people of Polish-Jewish descent
American documentary film directors
People from Córdoba, Argentina
Sons of the American Revolution
Articles containing video clips
21st-century American Jews
20th-century American male artists